Club Sol de América initialed SOL is a track and field athletics club based in the city of Asunción in Paraguay. The club is affiliated with the Federación Paraguaya de Atletismo. At national level, Sol de América is the best athletics club in Paraguay along with the Asociación de Atletismo del Alto Paraná and Paraguay Marathon Club.

Athletes

International

National

See also
List of athletics clubs in Paraguay

References

Sports teams in Paraguay
Athletics clubs in Paraguay
Sport in Asunción